Winged Creatures (released as Fragments on DVD) is a 2008 psychological drama directed by Rowan Woods and starring Kate Beckinsale, Dakota Fanning, Josh Hutcherson, Guy Pearce, Forest Whitaker, Jennifer Hudson, Jackie Earle Haley, Jeanne Tripplehorn and Embeth Davidtz. It is an adaptation of Roy Freirich's novel Winged Creatures. It was released on DVD by Sony Pictures Worldwide Acquisitions Group in the United States on August 4, 2009, as Fragments.

Plot
While in a restaurant, Carla Davenport, the restaurant cashier; Charlie Archenault, a driving-school teacher; Bruce Laraby, an emergency room physician; Annie Hagen, her father, and her best friend, Jimmy Jasperson suddenly hear gunshots. Annie and Jimmy retreat under a table as a suicidal gunman shoots several people (including Annie's father) and then himself. The film shows the aftermath as these five traumatized people struggle to regain their trust in the ordinary world.

Cast
 Dakota Fanning as Annie Hagen
 Josh Hutcherson as Jimmy Jasperson
 Forest Whitaker as Charlie Archenault
 Guy Pearce as Dr. Bruce Laraby
 Kate Beckinsale as Carla Davenport
 Jeanne Tripplehorn as Doris Hagen
 Jennifer Hudson as Kathy Archenault
 Jackie Earle Haley as Bob Jasperson
 Walton Goggins as Zack
 Embeth Davidtz as Jo Laraby
 Troy Garity as Ron Alber
 Robin Weigert as Lydia Jasperson
 Andrew Fiscella as Numbers Man
 Jaimz Woolvett as the Swedish Cook
 Hayley McFarland as Lori Carline
 Mae McGrath as the swag bystander
 Nick Farrell as swag bystander's wife and son

Reception 
In the United States' review aggregator, the Rotten Tomatoes, in the score where the site staff categorizes the opinions of independent media and mainstream media only positive or negative, the film has an approval rating of 45% calculated based on 31 critics reviews. By comparison, with the same opinions being calculated using a weighted arithmetic mean, the score achieved is 4,7/10. The website's critical consensus reads, "Sensitive but not insightful, Fragments pieces an ensemble together in the same way Crash did but without the gravitas."

References

External links

2008 films
2008 crime drama films
Films scored by Marcelo Zarvos
Films about suicide
Films based on American novels
Films directed by Rowan Woods
American independent films
American crime drama films
2008 independent films
2000s English-language films
2000s American films